Live in London is a (double) live album by Canadian singer-songwriter Leonard Cohen.  It was released on CD by Columbia/Sony March 31, 2009, is his 18th album, and his first live release since Field Commander Cohen: Tour of 1979 in 2001. A DVD of the performance was simultaneously released by Columbia/Sony.

Background
Part of the reason Cohen, who was 73 at the time, went on tour in 2008 was to rebuild his finances after being swindled by his manager, Kelley Lynch.  Sylvie Simmons explains in her 2012 biography on Cohen that Lynch "took care of Leonard's business affairs…[and was] not simply his manager but a close friend, almost part of the family." However, Simmons notes that in late 2004, Cohen's daughter Lorca began to suspect Lynch of financial impropriety, and when Cohen checked his bank accounts, he noticed that he had unknowingly paid a credit card bill of Lynch's for $75,000 and also found that most of the money in his accounts was gone (including money from his retirement accounts and charitable trust funds). Cohen would discover that this theft had actually begun as early as 1996 when Lynch started selling Cohen's music publishing rights despite the fact that Cohen had no financial incentive to do so at the time.  Cohen, who was on a five-year retreat at the Zen center Mount Baldy near Los Angeles at the time, remained oblivious.

On 8 October 2005, Cohen sued Kelley Lynch, alleging that she had misappropriated over US$5 million from Cohen's retirement fund leaving only $150,000. Cohen was sued in turn by other former business associates. These events placed him in the public spotlight, including a cover feature on him with the headline "Devastated!" in Canada's Maclean's magazine. In March 2006, Cohen won a civil suit and was awarded US$9 million by a Los Angeles County superior court. Lynch, however, ignored the suit and did not respond to a subpoena issued for her financial records. As a result, it was widely reported that Cohen might never be able to collect the awarded amount.

In the meantime, Cohen published a book of poetry, prose and drawings called Book of Longing in 2006 and produced Anjani's 2006 album Blue Alert (he also provided lyrics for the songs).  Cohen was also inducted into the Rock and Roll Hall of Fame  in 2008.  In his book Leonard Cohen: A Remarkable Life, biographer Anthony Reynolds observes that throughout the ordeal, Cohen remained  calm: "In public, at least, Cohen did seem remarkably sanguine about the loss.  He was never angry or accusatory, and his stock answer to the calamity was the dry one-liner, 'It's enough to put a dent in your mood' but when pushed he admitted, 'I don't know what helped me deal with it...I guess it just hasn't hit me yet.  Cohen, who had always professed to interviewers how much he enjoyed the discipline imposed by hard work, recognized the economic necessity of getting back on the road and announced a tour in January 2008.  The first show took place at the Fredericton Playhouse in New Brunswick.  Cohen played dates in Canada and Europe to enthusiastic crowds who were delighted to see him on stage again.

Live in London is Cohen's first full concert show release as well as his first released DVD.  The album was recorded July 17, 2008, at London's O2 Arena, and was released in both DVD and as a two-CD set. The album was long listed for the Polaris Music Prize.  Cohen's humility and self-deprecating sense of humor is evident in the between-song banter throughout the London performance, with him telling the audience, "It's been a long time since I stood on a stage in London.  It was about 14 or 15 years ago.  I was 60 years old, just a kid with a crazy dream.  Since then I've taken a lot of Prozac, Paxil, Wellbutrin, Effexor, Ritalin, Focalin.  I've also studied deeply in the philosophies of the religions but cheerfulness kept breaking through."

Reception
Mark Deming of AllMusic writes, "Cohen may have a reputation as one of the most dour performers in contemporary music, but his between-song patter is charmingly droll, and he finds a passion and a humanity in his songs that sets them apart from their studio counterparts."

Track listing

Disc 1

Disc 2

Musicians
 Leonard Cohen – vocals, acoustic guitar, keyboards
 Bob Metzger – lead guitar, pedal steel guitar, backing vocals
 Javier Mas – bandurria, laud, archilaud, 12-string acoustic guitar
 Roscoe Beck – bass, backing vocals, musical director
 Sharon Robinson – vocals
 Neil Larsen – keyboards, accordion
 Dino Soldo – saxophone, clarinet, harmonica, keyboards, backing vocals
 Rafael Bernardo Gayol – drums, percussion
The Webb Sisters:
 Charley Webb – backing vocals, guitar
 Hattie Webb – backing vocals, harp

Charts

Weekly charts

Year-end charts

Certifications

Album certifications

DVD certifications

References

External links
[ Live in London] at Allmusic

Leonard Cohen live albums
2009 live albums
Columbia Records live albums